Suseok, also called viewing stones or scholar's stones, is the Korean term for rocks resembling natural landscapes. The term also refers to the art of stone appreciation. The stone may be hand-carved or naturally occurring, with natural stones being of greater value. Such stones are similar to Chinese gongshi and Japanese suiseki.

Suseok can be any color. They vary widely in size – suseok can weigh hundreds of kilograms or much less than one kilogram, the largest of which may be displayed in traditional Korean gardens.

History
Suseok began as votive art over 3000 years ago and became a fixture of Korean society during the Joseon Dynasty, when Confucian scholars displayed them on their writing desks. From here is where the English name "scholar's rock" originates. Suseok regained popularity amongst nouveau riche businessmen in the 1980s during Korea's economic boom.

The art usually works on three scales: large installations of monumental shaped stones as ornamental gates; medium-sized shaped stones for landscape decoration within Korean gardens; and the smaller shaped stones for scholar's tables, the most important of these scales.

Chinese gongshi influenced the development of suseok in Korea.

Evaluation
Early on, important sites within landscape were marked with shaped stones, similarly to distance markers on post roads. Burial sites were also given permanent marking by large scale tumuli or mounds, often surrounded by anthropomorphic shaped stones much akin to that of Inuit or First Nations' memory markers. The animistic belief of nature being alive, and large-scaled elements of nature having souls, has led to the continued use of massive sculpted stone in natural forms throughout Korean traditional entranceways, as the firstgrowth cedarwood traditionally used for gates is now rare.

As Confucian scholarship ascended into the golden age of the Joseon dynasty, scholar rocks became an essential fixture of the writing tables of the yangban class of scholars, and a brilliant example of Confucian art. 
Smaller ceramic versions of scholar's rocks have been seen cast in celadon and used as brush-holders, as well as water droppers for scholar's calligraphy – particularly in the shape of small mountains.

Genres of Korean stone art

 mountain view (horizontal and vertical)
 shaped jade mountains
 shaped rock crystal mountains
 abstract shape 
 overhanging shapes
 organic mineral shapes (calcites, pyrites)
 stalactite and stalagmite stelae
 shamanistic shape
 single stone buddhas
 multiple stone buddhas
 astrological year figures (dragon, snake, monkey etc.)
 tree and house shapes
 fossilized fish
 fossilized insects
 enhanced coloured stones

Popular culture
A large desk-sized suseok appears prominently in the 2019 Korean film Parasite where it is given as a cursed gift from one of the characters in the film to another.  The suseok first appears to bring great fortune to the main character's immediate family, but the family then loses all of this fortune and is destroyed by their own greed and class conflict. In one scene it is used as a weapon to attack one of the main characters. It the end of the film, it is placed in a river to be forgotten.  The film won the award for Best Picture at the 2019 Academy Awards that year, the first foreign film ever to do so.

Standard reference work

 Soosuk, #72 in a series of books on Korean culture, Daewonsa Publishing Co, Ltd (Korea, 1989),  (in Korean)

See also
 Gongshi
 Suiseki
 Korean art
 Korean sculpture
 Korean culture

References

External links
 Bucheon Museum of Suseok at Bucheon.go.kr

Korean art
Korean sculpture
Rock art in Asia